The Sucite language or Sicite is a Senufo language spoken in southwestern Burkina Faso and Mali by approximately 35,000 people. Sucite is a close neighbour of the Supyire language, spoken in southeastern Mali. Sucite is sometimes regarded as the northern extension of the Supyire language. The two dialects are, according to Garber (1987), ‘quite mutually intelligible’. Sometimes speakers of Sucite will even refer to themselves as speaking Supyire. Another closely related lect is Mamara (also known as Minyanka).

Some other Senufo groups refers to the Sùcìté people as Tagba, because they live on the Tagouara plateau. There are various ways to spell the dialect names. Variants of Sucite include Sicite, Sipiite, and Sicire. The SIL language code is SEP.

Sounds

Vowels
All vowels can be lengthened and nasalized. The schwa /ə/ is included in brackets because it is found only in two specific environments, where it appears to be in complementary distribution with some other vowel.

Consonants

Tone
Sucite is a tonal language with three surface tone levels: High, Mid, and Low. Garber (1987) and Carlson (1994) analyse the Northern Senufo system as having two different Mid tones, a strong mid (Ms) and a weak mid (Mw). The Ms tone undergoes substantially less tonal alternations than the Mw tone. Garber (1988) suggests that this peculiarity may have its origin in a tonal split.

Glides formed by combining pairs of tones exist, the most common being HL and ML.

Grammar

Nouns
Like the other Senufo languages, Sucite employs a noun class system of five genders: three pairings of singular/plural classes and two mass/collective classes.

Nouns take class-specific suffixes for definiteness. For example:

Pronouns
Each noun class has its own set of pronouns. These may be general (clitic), emphatic, partitive, interrogative, demonstrative, or relative.

References

Sources 
Carlson, Robert (1994) A Grammar of Suppyire. Berlin/New York: Mouton de Gruyter.
Garber, Anne (1980) 'Word order change and the Senufo languages.' In Studies in the Linguistic Sciences, 10, 1, 45-57.
Garber, Anne (1987) A Tonal Analysis of Senufo: Sucite dialect (Gur; Burkina Faso). PhD dissertation, Urbana: University of Illinois / Ann Arbor: UMI. 
Garber, Anne (1988) 'A double tiered analysis of Sicite tone'. In Journal of West African languages, 18, 2, 21-33.

See also
Senufo languages
Map of the Senufo language area

Suppire–Mamara languages
Languages of Burkina Faso